Mzenga is a small town in eastern Tanzania.

Transport 

It is served by a station on the TAZARA Railway.

See also 

 Railway stations in Tanzania

References 

Populated places in Pwani Region